J. T. Brown may refer to:

Two Yorkshire cricketers, both John Thomas Brown:
Jack Brown (cricketer) (1869–1904), cricketer for Yorkshire and England
John Brown (cricketer, born 1874) (1874–1950), cricketer for Yorkshire
J. T. Brown (musician) (1918–1969), American tenor saxophonist of the Chicago blues era
J. T. Brown (ice hockey) (born 1990), American ice hockey player